Coalwood is an unincorporated coal town in McDowell County, West Virginia, United States. The coal mine in Coalwood reached its peak in the 1950s and ceased production on October 1, 1986. As of the 1990 census—the last time the town was counted separately—the population was 900. The town is the setting of Homer Hickam's best-selling memoir Rocket Boys, as well as its film adaptation, October Sky.

History
Coalwood was founded by George Lafayette Carter in 1905. He came on the back of a mule and eventually found rich seams of coal, and bought 20,000 acres (80 km). He constructed a mine, calling it the Carter Coal Company and built offices, houses, a schoolhouse, the Carter Coal Company Store, a church and more. Carter hired a dentist and doctor to provide service to his miners.

In 1922, Carter sold the mine and properties within the town to the Consolidation Coal Company. The company rebuilt the community and recruited new employees to work in the mines, but Carter regained the company when Consolidation Coal defaulted on its payments in 1933. Carter died in 1936, and the company was then taken over by his son James who sold it in 1947 to a group of industrialists who changed the company name to the Olga Coal Company.

In 1956, the Coalwood mine was connected underground to the nearby Caretta mine which was also owned by Olga. In 1959, Olga ceased bringing coal to the surface via Coalwood which prompted the Norfolk and Western Railway to begin pulling up the tracks leading to and from Coalwood.

The Coalwood-Caretta mine continued to be productive throughout most of the 20th century, producing on average one million tons annually until the mine was finally closed.

At its peak, Coalwood had a population of over 2,000.

In 1980, the Olga Coal Company was bought by the LTV Corporation which closed Coalwood's mine in 1986.

As of 2019 much of Coalwood sits abandoned including Big Creek High School where The Rocket Boys went. The buildings of the town still stand, although time and the elements have taken their toll. A primary school has been built at the former site of Big Creek High School.

October Sky Festival
Once a year, in October, Coalwood hosted an October Sky festival in honor of the accomplishments of the Rocket Boys. Many scientists and astronauts attended and Homer Hickam always made an appearance. The 2007 festival also represented the 50th anniversary of Sputnik, the first artificial satellite to go into orbit around the earth. Commemorating both events, an actor from the movie October Sky, Scott Miles, attended the festival to sign autographs. On February 7, 2012, the Cape Coalwood Restoration Association announced that the October 2011 festival, the 13th October Sky Festival, had been the last October Sky Festival. After the cancellation of the Rocket Boys/October Sky Festival was announced, Hickam was approached by a group of concerned Raleigh County citizens to inquire to the possibility of bringing the festival to their city. After weeks of conversations between the parties it was agreed that the 2012 Rocket Boys/October Sky Festival would be held in Beckley with many events taking place on the grounds of the Exhibition Coal Mine at New River Park on October 5–7. The Rocket Boys Festival remained an annual event in Beckley from 2012 to 2019, which was the last festival in Beckley. The 2020 festival was cancelled due to COVID-19.

References

External links

Coalwood, West Virginia
Coalwood, West Virginia at Coal Camp
Coalwood Memories
Homer Hickam Online

Unincorporated communities in McDowell County, West Virginia
Unincorporated communities in West Virginia
Mining communities in West Virginia
Company towns in West Virginia
Coal towns in West Virginia